Chistoozyorka is a rural locality (a selo) and the administrative center of Chistoozyorsky Selsoviet, Zavyalovsky District, Altai Krai, Russia. The population was 1,298 as of 2013. There are 13 streets.

Geography 
Chistoozyorka is located on the Kulunda plain, 13 km southwest of Zavyalovo (the district's administrative centre) by road. Zavyalovo is the nearest rural locality.

References 

Rural localities in Zavyalovsky District, Altai Krai